Eurockey Cup is a European roller hockey club competition for youth players. It is an initiative of Eurockey.com company and supported by the CERH, the Royal Spanish Roller Skating Federation and the Catalonia Roller Skating Federation.

The participating teams are invited by the organization, while being taken into consideration their respective National Leagues classification for each season, in order to replicate the spirit of the CERH European League. The competition comprises itself into two youth categories, one for the under-15 (since 2012) and another for the under-17 players (since 2014).

Eurockey Cup U-15
Eurockey Cup U-15 (also referred as U-15 Roller Hockey Champions League) is a European roller hockey club competition for under-15 players.

Editions and Winners

Medal table

Eurockey Cup FEM-15
Eurockey Cup FEM-15 (also referred as FEM-15 Roller Hockey Champions League) is a European roller hockey club competition for under-15 female players.

Editions and Winners

Medal table

Eurockey Cup U-17
Eurockey Cup U-17 (also referred as U-17 Roller Hockey Champions League) is a European roller hockey club competition for under-17 players.

Editions and Winners

Medal table

References

External links
 Official website

E